Nicolás Santiago Bertolo (born 2 January 1986) is an Argentinian professional footballer who plays as a winger for Banfield in the Argentine Primera División. His nickname is El Cordobes.

Career

Club
Bertolo was born in Córdoba, and came through the Boca Juniors youth system to make his professional debut on 10 January 2006 in a 3–2 win over Velez Sarsfield. In 2007 he was part of the Boca Juniors squad that won Copa Libertadores.

In 2008, Bertolo was loaned to Uruguayan club Nacional where he scored 3 goals in 15 appearances and in July 2008 he joined Banfield.

As a child Bertolo was a supporter of local side Instituto Atlético Central Córdoba but opted to join Boca Juniors instead. On 20 July 2009 Palermo acquired the Argentine midfielder from Banfield.

After a season as a backup player behind regulars Fabio Liverani, Antonio Nocerino and Giulio Migliaccio, Bertolo was sent on loan to Real Zaragoza of La Liga in August 2010, with an option for the Spanish club to sign him permanently at the end of the season. He ended the season with 36 appearances and 5 goals, but Zaragoza ultimately opted not to acquire the player, leading him to a return to Palermo. Scored his first goal in rosanero on 21 September 2011 against Cagliari, in a Serie A match.

On 29 December 2012 he moved to the Mexican club Cruz Azul. On 8 August 2013 he returned to Banfield, initially on loan, before joining River Plate two years later and won the Copa Libertadores within his first few games for the club. However, after fifteen appearances in two seasons for River Plate he found himself back with Banfield, joining on loan in 2016.

International
He made his International debut on 1 June 2011 against Nigeria in a 4–1 defeat. Played against Poland four days from the first minute.

Honours
Boca Juniors
 Argentine Primera División: 2005–06 Clausura
 Copa Libertadores: 2007

Cruz Azul
 Copa MX: 2012–13 Clausura

Banfield
 Primera B Nacional: 2013–14

River Plate
 Copa Libertadores: 2015
 Suruga Bank Championship: 2015

References

External links

 Argentine Primera statistics

1986 births
Living people
Footballers from Córdoba, Argentina
Argentine footballers
Argentina international footballers
Argentine expatriate footballers
Association football midfielders
Boca Juniors footballers
Club Nacional de Football players
Club Atlético Banfield footballers
Palermo F.C. players
Real Zaragoza players
Cruz Azul footballers
Club Atlético River Plate footballers
Club Atlético Platense footballers
Argentine Primera División players
Serie A players
La Liga players
Liga MX players
Primera Nacional players
Expatriate footballers in Italy
Expatriate footballers in Spain
Expatriate footballers in Uruguay
Expatriate footballers in Mexico
Argentine expatriate sportspeople in Italy
Argentine expatriate sportspeople in Spain
Argentine expatriate sportspeople in Uruguay
Argentine expatriate sportspeople in Mexico
Argentine people of Italian descent